Count Vertigo is a supervillain created by Gerry Conway, Trevor Von Eeden and Vince Colletta as an enemy of Black Canary and later Green Arrow in the DC Comics Universe. Count Vertigo is the last descendant of the royal family that ruled the small eastern European country of Vlatava that was taken over by the Soviets and later became devastated by the Spectre.

Two incarnations of Count Vertigo, Cecil Adams and Werner Zytle, appeared as guest characters in Arrow, portrayed by Seth Gabel and Peter Stormare respectively.

Publication history
Count Vertigo first appears in World's Finest Comics #251 (July 1978) and was created by Gerry Conway, Trevor Von Eeden, and Vince Colletta.

Fictional character biography

Starting his career
Count Vertigo first appeared in Star City, where he attempted to steal back the jewels his parents had sold when they escaped to England after the war. The victim of a hereditary inner ear defect that affected his balance, Vertigo had a small electronic device implanted in his right temple that compensated for this problem. Tinkering with the device, Vertigo learned he was able to affect other people's balance as well, distorting their perceptions so that they literally couldn't tell up from down, an effect known as vertigo. Donning a costume and taking the name "Count Vertigo", he embarked on a life of crime. This would bring him into conflict with the heroes Green Arrow and Black Canary. Count Vertigo's black and green costume with its insignia of concentric rings, was designed by Trevor Von Eeden. The patterning of the cape's inner lining was a tribute to Steve Ditko's distinctively arcane artwork.

Running with the Suicide Squad
He would later come to join the Suicide Squad in exchange for a shortened prison sentence, and it was revealed that he was plagued by bipolar disorder. After the Suicide Squad disbanded for the first time, Count Vertigo was captured by Vlatavan rebels, who wished to use his powers to overthrow the current Vlatavan government. They used a variety of drugs on him, each with a differing effect on the Count, as he would for example suddenly see himself as an Angel of Vengeance, sent to wreak havoc on the current rulers. Although he largely believed himself master of his own will, his mood swings were completely subject to his captors.

He was captured by Poison Ivy when the Suicide Squad came in and resolved the conflict and Kaligari (then-ruler of Vlatava) was murdered. Count Vertigo was Poison Ivy's slave for a long period of time, during which he grew to hate Poison Ivy and frequently threatened to kill her when he was free of her control. Amanda Waller was able to free Vertigo of her control so that he could stop a group of missiles hitting Dome of the Rock in Jerusalem at the behest of the villain Kobra. If the Dome had been destroyed, innocent lives would have been lost in a resulting war.

Vertigo succeeded, and it turned out that as he went into rehab and expunged the chemicals that had been pumped into his body by both Ivy and the rebels, that he was unwittingly cured of the disorder that had plagued him for so long. This was something he found hard to deal with and he approached Deadshot, one of his teammates, hoping that Deadshot would be willing to end his life. As it happened, Deadshot was unmoved by his teammate's plight, and saw no problem in killing once again. However, he cautioned Vertigo to make up his mind - after all, he would not fail or hesitate. The running subplot would ultimately culminate in the last pages of the first volume of Suicide Squad, in which Deadshot and Vertigo stood across one another, Deadshot ready to kill him. Count Vertigo realized that this was ultimately an indirect suicide, and that would ruin his chances for the afterlife. Deciding for now that he would deal with the disease that now indirectly plagued him, he walked away from the duel.

In the meantime, he was also approached by members of the Vlatavan government, who sought to see Count Vertigo reclaim his rightful place as ruler. He declined, stating that he wasn't fit to rule at this point, as he wasn't even sure if he wanted to live or die.

Vertigo also resolved his grudge with Poison Ivy. During the War of the Gods crossover, he was perfectly willing to let her die when he found her abandoned on an Amazonian island; ironically, she was bound and promised whoever freed her, her undying devotion. Snickering snidely, Vertigo left her to die in the ruins of the collapsing temple they were in. Still, Ivy was saved, and Count Vertigo would later reluctantly work alongside her in the Suicide Squad, leaving their grudge be.

The destruction of Vlatava
Ultimately, Count Vertigo did return to his homeland to ensure that he would once more become the country's rightful ruler. While his forces were at war with the government's army, the Spectre appeared, and already unhinged, was horrified by the slaughter that occurred. In a fit of rage he deemed the entire country and its inhabitants to be full of sin and decided to cleanse it, leaving behind only Vlatava's president at the time and Count Vertigo.

Grudges and a new Injustice Society
Working for the American government for a while, Count Vertigo eventually sought out his old enemy Green Arrow and after the two had a fight, Count Vertigo decided to leave the vendetta behind and focus on more positive prospects, getting his life back on track. Afterwards he showed up as a member of the new Injustice Society.

He also shows up as an operative of the Suicide Squad when they attempt to dissuade the Justice League from investigating the "Salvation Run" project.

Infinite Crisis, 52 and One Year Later
Count Vertigo has been seen among Lex Luthor's ranks in the Secret Society of Super Villains in the pages of Infinite Crisis.

He appeared during the 52-week series, as a member of a Suicide Squad led by Atom Smasher against the Black Marvel Family. He is with Captain Boomerang (Owen Mercer), Persuader,  Plastique and Electrocutioner.

He appears "One Year Later" in the revamped Checkmate title as part of its regular cast as the White Queen's Knight under White Queen Amanda Waller. He is later seen capturing the Rogues responsible for the murder of the Flash, alongside a new Suicide Squad composed of Bronze Tiger, Captain Boomerang (Owen Mercer), Plastique, Multiplex and Deadshot.

Even later, he would feature again as an operative of Waller's Suicide Squad, siding faithfully to her side in destroying a conspiracy to release a violent viral agent, working alongside fellow agent King Faraday. In this capacity, he would also duel against the Secret Six, and briefly take down Black Alice with his vertigo abilities.

During the events of Final Crisis, he is seen defeated as part of a Checkmate squad sent against the forces of Darkseid in Bludhaven. Seen with him is Negative Woman, Mr. Bones and members of the Atomic Knights. The novel version of Final Crisis says Count Vertigo and the others have all been slain.

The New 52 / Werner Zytle
In September 2011, The New 52 rebooted DC's continuity. In this new timeline, Count Vertigo made his debut in Green Arrow (vol. 5) #22. Here, he is Werner Zytle, ruler of the tiny nation of Vlatava. Though of noble heritage, his family lost their fortunes and had to flee to Canada. While there, Zytle became involved with organized crime, using the profits from his illegal activities to finance return to Vlatava and reclaim his birthright. Though appearing to be a kind and benevolent monarch, he continues to be involved in organized crime, using the alias Count Vertigo. When Green Arrow travels to Vlatava to rescue a kidnapped Shado, Vertigo notes that the Emerald Archer will have to aim to fight him, and his power will make that impossible. Oliver's allies remotely detonate an EMP arrow in his quiver, giving him and Shado a chance to escape. Green Arrow (vol. 5) #23.1 a "Villains Month" tie-in, also known as Count Vertigo #1, examines Vertigo's youth in Vancouver and his return to Vlatava.

Count Vertigo later appears as a member of Richard Dragon's Longbow Hunters. With a new look in DC Rebirth, Count Vertigo appears in Green Arrow.

Powers and abilities
Being raised in a noble family, Vertigo was trained in classical martial combat and the sports of boxing, fencing, and equestrianism. He has also been trained in judo and general karate.

Upon joining Task Force X and Checkmate, he learned other hand-to-hand combat skills.

His "Vertigo Effect" has long since been internalized through circumstances that have not yet been revealed. He uses his power to disrupt his enemies' balance. In hand-to-hand and melee combat, Vertigo uses his power to disorient his opponents. He also uses the Vertigo Effect to disrupt the aim of gunmen, snipers and the like. The exact range of the power is yet to be determined, seeing as how on one mission, guards watching him in action on camera were also affected by his power. This ability is also capable of disrupting guidance systems on missiles, vehicles, and detection systems of all kind (lasers, cameras, pressure-sensitive floor plates, infrared, thermal, and night vision). Count Vertigo also wears magnetic boots with which he can walk walls or ceilings. He also has in recent years gained the ability of flight.

Ménière's disease
During a fight with the Justice Society of America, Doctor Mid-Nite suggested that the source of Count Vertigo's powers was a condition known as Ménière's disease. This condition causes constant vertigo in those afflicted and in some cases—such as that of Count Vertigo—deafness. Therefore, the hearing aid devices used by Vertigo to inflict his condition on others are necessary for him to be able to hear or maintain his balance, creating a weakness that his opponents can easily exploit.

Other versions

Flashpoint
In the alternate timeline of the Flashpoint event, Vertigo lost his family from the Amazon/Atlantean war. He volunteered to be part of the Resistance to rescue some circus members, Boston Brand, Dick Grayson and Rag Doll for the Resistance. Vertigo then retrieves Doctor Fate's Helm of Nabu from the Amazons' attacks. Vertigo and the other circus members run at the countryside for reinforcements, but Vertigo is killed, impaled on a spear. A dying Vertigo tells Dick to take the Helm and secure it.

In other media

Television

 Count Vertigo, referred to simply as Vertigo, appears in the Batman: The Animated Series episode "Off Balance", voiced by Michael York. This version's "Vertigo Effect" is derived from an eyepatch, which Batman theorizes to be radioactive, and is a leading member of the Society of Shadows. After being defeated by Batman and Talia al Ghul, Vertigo is presumed dead.
 Count Vertigo appears in The Batman episode "Vertigo", voiced by Greg Ellis. This version is a scientist and ex-employee of Oliver Queen who wields a mechanical eyepiece, which he used to strand Queen on a deserted island for years.
 Count Vertigo appears in Young Justice, voiced by Steve Blum. This version is a member of the Light. Introduced in the episode "Revelation", the Light tasks him with leading the Injustice League to throw the Justice League and the Team off their trail. While the Injustice League is defeated, Vertigo uses his diplomatic immunity to avoid prison. In the episode "Coldhearted", he attempts to assassinate his niece, Queen Perdita Vladek, in the hopes of taking over Vlatava, but is foiled by Kid Flash, has his diplomatic immunity revoked, and imprisoned in Belle Reve. As of the third season episodes "Royal We" and "Eminent Threat", Vertigo escaped from prison and took part in a metahuman trafficking ring in Markovia, only to be defeated by the Team once more.
 Two incarnations of Count Vertigo appear in Arrow, with both being involved in the distribution of a street drug called "Vertigo" and displaying great skill in using it as an offensive weapon via syringes.
 The first is a secretive drug dealer named Cecil Adams, who is portrayed by Seth Gabel and appears in the second season episode "State v. Queen". While he goes unnamed in the episode, his name is revealed in the fifth season episode "Kapiushon". Initially using the street name "The Count" (based on the needle marks of his drugs resembling vampire bites) before taking on the name "Count Vertigo", he poisons Starling City's citizens, such as Thea Queen, with his namesake drug. Upon learning of this, her brother Oliver Queen develops a bitter rivalry with Adams, which culminates in the former killing him before he can fatally dose Felicity Smoak with Vertigo.
 The second is Adams' successor Werner Zytle, portrayed by Peter Stormare. In the season three episodes "The Calm" and "Canaries", he becomes the new "Vertigo" and takes advantage of Queen capturing his mob rivals to rapidly build a criminal empire. Additionally, Zytle modified his namesake drug so that it causes the user to experience their deepest fears. Throughout his appearances, he battles Queen and Laurel Lance, both of whom eventually capture Zytle.

Film
 Count Vertigo was reportedly featured in David S. Goyer's script for Escape from Super Max as an inmate of the titular Super Max Penitentiary for Metahumans.
 Count Vertigo appears in DC Showcase: Green Arrow, voiced by Steve Blum.
 Count Vertigo appears in flashbacks depicted in Suicide Squad: Hell to Pay, voiced by Jim Pirri. This version was a member of a previous iteration of the Suicide Squad who formed an alliance with Jewelee in an attempt to betray Amanda Waller, only to be killed by the latter for it.

Video games
Count Vertigo appears as a playable character in Lego DC Super-Villains, voiced again by Steve Blum.

Miscellaneous
The Arrowverse incarnation of Werner Zytle appears in the non-canon tie-in comic Arrow: Season 2.5.

References

Green Arrow characters
DC Comics male supervillains
Black Canary characters
Fictional deaf characters
Fictional counts and countesses
Fictional henchmen
Comics characters introduced in 1978
DC Comics martial artists
DC Comics scientists
Fictional characters with bipolar disorder
Characters created by Gerry Conway
Fictional Eastern European people
Suicide Squad members
DC Comics metahumans